Adrian Grant (born 16 June 1961) is a Barbadian cricketer. He played in twelve first-class and eight List A matches for the Barbados cricket team from 1986 to 1989.

See also
 List of Barbadian representative cricketers

References

External links
 

1961 births
Living people
Barbadian cricketers
Barbados cricketers
Cricketers from Bridgetown